Mukhtar Atiku Kurawa a professor of Inorganic Chemistry, Nigerian academician, administrator, and the former Rector of Kano State Polytechnic, the 3rd substantive Vice Chancellor of Yusuf Maitama Sule University, Kano.

Early life and education 
Kurawa was born on 28 August 1970, at Kurawa quarters, of Kano municipal Local Government Area, of Kano State. He attended Yolawa Islamiyya Primary School, Kano between 1976 and 1981, he also attended Government Secondary School, Rano and Government Secondary School Kofar Nassarawa between 1981 and 1983 Kurawa also attended Science Secondary School Dawakin Tofa between 1983 and 1986, Kurawa obtained Bachelor of Science in Chemistry and Master of Science in Inorganic Chemistry from Bayero University Kano 1991 and 1999 respectively Kurawa also obtained a Doctor of Philosophy in Inorganic Chemistry at the University of Bristol, United Kingdom in 2005.

Career
Kurawa was the Lecturer under faculty of Science of Bayero University Kano, Department of Chemistry were he held so many responsibilities from committees member, Level Coordinator, up to Head of Chemistry Department in 2011 and become the Dean, Faculty of Science in 2015 and also promoted to the rank of professor of Inorganic Chemistry in year the same year.

Kurawa was appointed Rector of Kano State Polytechnic in 2016 by Kano State Governor Abdullahi Umar Ganduje where he served for four years and he was appointed the 3rd substantive Vice-Chancellor of Yusuf Maitama Sule University, Kano on 2nd October 2020 by the Governing Board of the University where he assumed office on the 22nd October 2020. Kurawa was also a member of the tenth (10th) Governing Board of the Joint Admissions and Matriculation Board (JAMB).

Kurawa had a lot of publication within and outside the Nigeria

References

1970 births
Living people
Alumni of the University of Bristol
Bayero University Kano alumni
Academic staff of Bayero University Kano
Vice-Chancellors of Nigerian universities